Gradeshnitsa is a village of the Vratsa Province, Bulgaria.

The village is notable for the Gradeshnitsa monastery (situated 1.5 km west of the village), and for the neolithic Gradeshnitsa tablets now kept in Vratsa museum.

External links
http://www.bulgarianmonastery.com/gradeshnitsa_monastery.html

Villages in Vratsa Province